Fernando David Luna (born 19 January 1990) is an Argentine professional footballer who plays as a midfielder for Independiente Rivadavia.

Career
Luna began with Defensores de Belgrano in 2011, prior to having subsequent spells with Social Ramallo, Américo Tesorieri, Atlético Uruguay (loan) and La Emilia. He left La Emilia in 2013 to join Villa Dálmine of Primera B Metropolitana. He made his debut for the club on 3 August in a league match against Comunicaciones. Ten more appearances came, one included his only goal for Villa Dálmine, before he departed to sign for fellow Primera B Metropolitana team Tristán Suárez. He went onto make twenty-seven appearances and scored three goals in two seasons with Tristán Suárez.

In July 2015, Luna joined Argentine Primera División club Arsenal de Sarandí on loan for the 2015 and 2016 campaigns. He played his first top-flight game on 4 August in a 4–1 loss to Banfield, while in his next match, vs. Boca Juniors, Luna scored one of his two goals for Arsenal. Overall, he participated fifteen times for Arsenal and scored twice before returning to his parent club. On 11 July 2016, Luna joined Primera División side Atlético de Rafaela permanently. Five goals in twenty-eight matches followed. At the end of the 2016–17 campaign, Luna left to join Ecuadorian Serie A team Emelec. He scored three goals in twenty appearances in all competitions during his first season with Emelec, which concluded with them winning the 2017 league title.

On 26 December 2019 Club Atlético Patronato confirmed, that Luna had joined the club on a deal until the summer 2021.

Career statistics
.

Honours
Emelec
Ecuadorian Serie A: 2017

References

External links
 

1990 births
Living people
Sportspeople from Buenos Aires Province
Argentine footballers
Association football midfielders
Argentine expatriate footballers
Primera B Metropolitana players
Argentine Primera División players
Ecuadorian Serie A players
Villa Dálmine footballers
CSyD Tristán Suárez footballers
Arsenal de Sarandí footballers
Atlético de Rafaela footballers
C.S. Emelec footballers
Club Atlético Patronato footballers
Independiente Rivadavia footballers
Argentine expatriate sportspeople in Ecuador
Expatriate footballers in Ecuador